The Anchor University is a private Christian university owned by the Deeper Christian Life Ministry. The university is located at Ayobo, Ipaja, Lagos State, southwestern Nigeria.

History
The process of founding Anchor University billed for September 2012, but suffered a huge setback as the representatives of the NUC coming for final inspection and approval of their multi-billion projects were in the ill fated Dana Air crash. Professor Celestine Onwuliri, husband of a serving minister and an executive director with the Nigerian Universities Commission was among the over 157 victims that died in the Dana Air crash which occurred on Sunday, June 3, 2012. He was the leader of the team. Construction began in 2013. The University was founded in 2014 by Deeper Christian Life Ministry. It was approved by the Nigerian University Commission (NUC) on Wednesday, 2 November 2016.

Faculties
There are three faculties in the university.
Faculty of Humanities
Faculty of Science and Science Education
Faculty of Social and Management Sciences

NUC Approval
Faculty Of Humanities
Faculty Of Natural & Applied Sciences
Faculty Of Social & Management Sciences

Programmes
(a) Faculty of Humanities
B.A. History & Diplomatic Studies
B.A. English & Literary Studies
B.A. Christian Religious Studies
B.A. French

(b) Faculty of Social & Management Sciences
B.Sc. Accounting
B.Sc. Business Administration
B.Sc. Economics
B.Sc. Political Science
B.Sc. Mass Communication
B.Sc. International Relations
B.Sc. Banking and Finance

(c) Faculty of Natural & Applied Sciences
B.Sc. Biology
B.Sc. Microbiology
B.Sc. Biochemistry
B.Sc. Mathematics
B.Sc. Computer Science
B.Sc. Physics
B.Sc. Chemistry
B.Sc. Industrial Chemistry
B.Sc. Information Technology
B.Sc. Biotechnology
B.Sc. Physics with Electronics
B.Sc. Applied Geophysics
B.Sc. Geology
B.Sc. (Ed) Chemistry
B.Sc. (Ed) Biology
B.Sc. (Ed) Computer Science
B.Sc. (Ed) Mathematics
B.Sc. (Ed) Physics

See also
Academic libraries in Nigeria

References

Educational institutions established in 2014
2014 establishments in Nigeria
Education in Lagos State
Evangelical universities and colleges
Anchor University
Christian universities and colleges in Nigeria
Academic libraries in Nigeria